Brandon Paul Pieters (born 22 April 1976) is a South African professional golfer.

Pieters was born in Germiston, Gauteng. He turned professional in 1994 and has played on the Sunshine Tour since then. His best finish on the Order of Merit came in 2008 when he finished in 32nd. Pieters picked up his first professional victory in May 2009 at the Vodacom Business Origins of Golf Tour event at Pretoria CC. He picked up his second win a month later at the Vodcacom Business Origins of Golf Tour event at Fancourt, and went on to claim victory at that season's Vodacom Business Origins of Golf Tour Final in October.

Professional wins (5)

Sunshine Tour wins (4)

*Note: The 2009 Vodacom Origins of Golf at Fancourt was shortened to 36 holes due to weather.

Sunshine Tour playoff record (1–1)

IGT Pro Tour wins (1)

External links

South African male golfers
Sunshine Tour golfers
Sportspeople from Germiston
White South African people
1976 births
Living people